Freda Gardner (April 7, 1929 - May 9, 2020) was the professor emerita of Christian education at Princeton Theological Seminary, and was the Moderator of the General Assembly of the Presbyterian Church (USA) in 1999.  She was elected as Moderator, the church's highest elected position, at the 211th General Assembly, on the second ballot.

Gardner was the first woman to serve as a tenured faculty member at Princeton Seminary, teaching there from 1961 until her retirement in 1992. In 1981 she was named Educator of the Year, in 1994 she was a recipient of the Women of Faith award, and in 2001 she was recognized as a Champion for Children. She had written numerous books on religion and ministry.

References 

1929 births
2020 deaths
American religion academics
Princeton Theological Seminary faculty